Saffron Walden County High School (SWCHS) is a coeducational academy school for ages 11–18 in Saffron Walden, Essex, England. The school is also an accredited training school, and was formerly a specialist Technology College. The current executive headteacher is Caroline Derbyshire (following the departure of John Hartley) and the associate headteacher is Polly Lankester.

The 2018 Sunday Times School Guide ranked the school as the best non-selective state school in East Anglia.

Facilities

Halls 
In November 2013, the school opened a new "world-class" concert hall dubbed Saffron Hall. The £10m auditorium was funded by the Yellow Car Charitable Trust and replaced the previous main school hall. Saffron Hall won the Project of the Year award at the Royal Institution of Chartered Surveyors East of England Awards 2014.

The only cinema in Saffron Walden has operated within the school since 2006. It is a not-for-profit cinema run by volunteer projectionists using both digital projectors and 35mm film. Both Saffron Screen and Saffron Hall are open to the public outside of school hours and used by the school otherwise.

Sport 
SWCHS has developed a growing sporting pedigree, particularly in Rugby Union.

SWCHS have developed many skilled athletes for example Gabriel Ramiah, known for competing in Mr Olympia

Notable alumni

 Ben Maher, show jumper
 Iain Dale, Broadcaster

References

External links

Saffron Walden County High School
OFSTED entry
Saffron Hall
Saffron Walden Cinema (Saffron Screen)
 

Academies in Essex
Training schools in England
Secondary schools in Essex